"What's Love" is a 2008 single by Shaggy featuring Akon.

What's Love may also refer to:

 What's Love? (album), a 2009 album by Juju
 "What's Luv?", a 2002 song by Fat Joe
 "What's Love??", a 2021 song by Rod Wave from the album SoulFly

See also
 What's Love Got to Do with It? (disambiguation)
 What Is Love (disambiguation)